Al-Barāʾ ibn Mālik al-Anṣārī (died ) was one of the Sahaba, an Ansar belonging to the Banū al-Najjār branch of the Banu Khazraj. al-Baraa' is the brother of Anas ibn Malik.

A courageous warrior with exceptional combat skill, al-Baraa was a Muslim hero during Early Muslim conquests who killed a hundred enemies in combat and personally breached the enemy fortress gates in the Battle of Yamama and the Siege of Shushtar.

al-Baraa' died around 641-642 as he succumbed to his wounds during his last siege in Shushtar against Sasanian Empire

Biography 
Al-Bara' Hailed from Banu Ghanm clan, sub branch of Banū al-Najjār branch belonged to the of the Banu Khazraj tribe.

During the time of the Prophet, al-Baraa' were working as camel chanter. During the battle of Hunayn, al-Bara' has been rewarded Khums or fifth portion of spoils of war which he got from enemies he slay personally. Al-Bara' was said to participate in all campaigns under Muhammad, except the battle of Badr. Al-Bara' also recorded to participate in the pledge of the Tree during the first pilgrimage. al-Bara' also recorded having participate in the Battle of Hunayn, where he received a fifth spoils of war for every person he killed during the battle.

Ridda wars 
Following the death of the Prophet, the Muslims began to leave Islam in groups just as they had entered it. Caliph Abu Bakr dispatched eleven armies to fight the leaders of the rebellion in what became known as the Ridda wars.

During the Battle of Yamama, al-Baraa' played distinguished role as when the rebels army under Musailamah Al Kadhab and his  40,000 soldiers from Banu Hanifa fortified themselves into the fortress which named Garden of Death, Ikrima ibn Abi Jahl and Khalid ibn al-Walid struggled to break through the high walls of the garden until al-Baraa' suggested they place him on a shield and using spears and catapults al-Baraa' into the fortress wall. The Muslims agreed with al-Baraa' plan and al-Baraa' immediately fell into the fortress as intended, killing many town guards on the wall and fortress gate inside singlehandedly and rushed towards the gate and open it alone from inside, allowing Muslim forces under Khalid ibn al Walid to swarm inside and killed 20,000 of the apostates, including their leader Musailama, killed by Wahshi and Abu Dujana al Ansari. During this battle, Ibn Hajar also noted a testimony of al-Bara' himself that he engaged in a duel against a huge Musaylamah warrior nicknamed Himar al Yamama (donkey of Yamama). Al-Bara managed to cut one of his foot with his sword, and caused him dropped to the ground, Then al-Bara grab the man's sword and finishing him by using his own sword.

Despite suffered grave injuries which numbered over 80 wounds, al-Baraa' managed to survive on the aftermath of the Yamama battle. After the battle, Khalid ibn al Walid was said to personally visit his tents where he still treating his wound and rest.

Conquest of Persia 

In the final battle of this island in the fortress of Zarah,  al-Baraa' killed the Persian Marzban commander of the area in duel, and managed to seize the wealth of the said commander of 30,000 coins after the battle. However, caliph 'Umar saw that it was too much for single person to acquire spoils of war that huge, so the Caliph decided that al-Bara' should be given a four portions after it being divided into five, while one portion are sent for the caliphate treasury.

Later, during the Muslim conquest of Persia, al-Bara' participated in the battle of al-Qadisiyyah, where he was urged by other soldiers to pray for victory on this difficult battle, since the Muslim soldiers in that battle believed if al-Baraa' prayed, his wishes will always be granted by Allah.

During Muslim conquest of Khuzestan, The highest commander of Muslim army, Abu Musa al-Ash'ari requested to the caliph to provide him with elite guards from Ansar (military) component, which replied by Umar to sent a group of Ansaris including al-Bara' ibn Malik along with his brother, Anas. In the campaign on Khuzestan, the Muslims faced a particularly difficult battle on the bridge of Susa, eastern of Tigris river, as the enemy gained upper hand at the first of the battle. Thus the Muslims soldiers once again came to al-Bara' asking for prayer, and after al-Bara' finished his prayer, the Muslims fight again until the managed to gained upper hand and seized victory.

Later, during the Siege of Shushtar, al-Baraa' once again gave important contribution as he and Mujaz'ah ibn Thawr as-Sadusi lead a small team of 35 soldiers to sneak from the waterway under the impenetrable fortress wall that has been besieged for almost one year, and killing many guards on the city gate before opened the gate and allowed the Muslims army under Abu Musa al-Ash'ari storm the city and subdue the town. According to his own word that has been recorded in Siyar A'lam Nubala chronicle written by Al-Dhahabi and in Usd al-ghabah fi marifat al-Saḥabah chronicle which written by Ibn al-Athir, al-Bara' ibn Malik  singlehandedly slayed at least 100 Sassanid soldiers during this battle alone.

Death 
Muslim chroniclers recorded two versions regarding when al-Bara' fallen on the battle:

 According to Ibn Hajar al-Asqalani version The martyrdom al-Bara' was seeking was gained in the Siege of Shushtar in Persia, but only after he rescued his brother Anas from the molten hooks, which caused he suffered grief injury to the point that his own palms melted and showing the bones in his effort to break the chain from Anas, al-Baraa' succumbed to the wound shortly after Anas were rescued.
 Meanwhile, Malik ibn Anas, Tabari, Bukhari, Ibn Hibban, and Ibn Manda reported the second version that al-Baraa' was fallen indeed in siege of Shushtar, but not by the molten steel hook of Sassanid army, instead he died at the hand of Hormuzan in this battle. al-Dhahabi favored this version as he deemed this authentic, which also narrated by al-Bayhaqi. Al-Dhahabi also add note that al-Bara' was twenty years old during his death.

Character assessment 

Chroniclers describe that al-Baraa' was skinny and thin in appearance but extremely brave on the battlefield.

However, this attribute were viewed as downside by Umar ibn al Khattab, as the caliph once gave message to his generals to never assign al-Baraa' to hold any command position, since Umar saw al-Baraa' reckless bravery will expose his own soldiers to dangers. Nevertheless, despite his doubt on al-Bara' leadership, caliph Umar still valued al-Bara' martial prowess, as remarked by modern writer Khalid Muhammad Khalid in his book, Rijala Hawla Rasulullah Shalallahu 'Alaihi Wassalam, that during Muslim conquest of Khuzestan, when Suhayl ibn Adiyy were sent by Abu Musa al-Ash'ari to invade Ahwaz, caliph Umar specifically instructed Abu Musa to include al-Bara' within Suhayl invading force.

Anas ibn Malik were recorded to say that al-Bara' had beautiful voice and loved reciting poems frequently, until Anas persuade his brother to recite Qur'an instead of poetries.

Prayer 
Chroniclers narrated that prophet Muhammad once praised al-Baraa' as a pious figure whose prayer will be always responded by Allah, despite his poor and underestimated social status.

Caliphate soldiers during battle of Qadisiyyah believed the miraculous prayer of al-Bara' urged al-Bara' to use his prayer to win the battle, as they though the battle of Qadisiyyah, were difficult to won.

While another record during the battle of the bridge of Susa in Iran, the Muslim soldiers once again came to al-Bara' to seek for his prayer to win the battle.

Meanwhile, during the siege of Shushtar, Muslim historians also though that it is due to al-Baraa' prayer that the fortress of Shushtar can be subdued by Muslim forces, despite the city was very hard to subdue and believed to be almost impossible to breach by any military mean. various narration further adds that al-Barra' also included his victorious prayer that he also wished to get killed by enemy in the battle of Susa bridge, so he can achieve martyrdom.

Legacy

Scholar analysis 
al-Bara' is viewed highly in the Islamic scholarly community in general, as Companions of the Prophet, collectively named al-salaf al-ṣāliḥ (pious ancestors), they are regarded as their as daily religious role model. This view was outlined by Ibn Taymiyyah, both in their figure as a guideline and in practicing Islamic religious observances. Ibn Taymiyyah further observes the special rank within the Companions from the Ansar, which are according to him, vital for the faith, as he quoted the hadith, "love for the Ansar is a sign of Iman, while hatred against them is a sign of hypocrisy".

Spoils of war 
Scholars of Islamic Fiqh jurisprudence have taken notes regarding al-Bara' case when his managed to seize massive amount of a spoils of war during the battle in Darin island, after he managed to subdue Sassanid fortress and killing the commander, which immediately ruled by Umar the spoils from the enemy seized by al-Bara' should be divided by five, whereas four portions be given to al-Bara, while one portion are separated to be combined to the total amount spoils of the battle. incident has discussed about the rulings in Sunni jurisprudence on the later era about how every single soldier has a right for a Khums, or four of a fifth portion of spoils of war, according to his performance deeds in the battlefield.

Averroes from Maliki school remarked this record  in his book Bidayat al Mujtahid Wa Nihayat al Muqtashid   which he got from the tradition of Ibn Abi Shaybah and Ibn Sirin, that the case of al-Bara' divided share were the first case in Islam history, and has become guidelines by later jurists to measure the rights of soldiers regarding spoils of war. While Ibn Mawaz, another Maliki scholar, has denied this al-Bara' tradition regarding spoils of war, as he though he never know such Hadith existed.

However, Izz al-Din ibn 'Abd al-Salam, a Shafiite scholar and Mamluk general in 12th AD century who led Baibars army against Louis IX of France crusaders and Ilkhanate Mongol, dismissing Ibn Mawaz claim and has arguing with another tradition that this practice has been done before as Muhammad during the battle of Hunayn, and Muhammad even gave the fifth spoils to al-Bara', the very same person who were given the fifth by Umar in Darin island battle.

Martyrdom 
since Madhhab Sahabi(opinion of the Companions of the Prophet) were accepted as one of the jurisprudence source in Islam, The historical act of al-Bara' to seek martyrdom in Jihad by plunging himself inside enemy castle in the Battle of Yamamah, where the enemy barricaded themselves, are translated by Islamist factions with Extremism view that the Terrorism act  using Suicide attack with IED were allowed in modern analogy (Qiyas). Thus, leading some extremist movements such as Free Syrian Army, ISIS Kurdistan Ansar as Sunna Group, and Al-Qaeda in various regions to form a suicide squad which they named, in curiously similar theme, as "al-Bara Ibn Malik Martyrs' Brigade" in accordance to their apparent attempt to associate their acts with al Bara' in Yamama.

However, this view were rejected by contemporary Islamic scholars, particularly those in line with the view of Abdullah Ibn Jibreen,
Abd al-Aziz Bin Baz and Muhammad ibn al-Uthaymeen, three of prominent Saudi Arabia Muftis and clerics, opined that the act of al-Baraa' cannot be analogized as an act suicide bombings particularly for three different reasons:
 Method which done by al-Bara' were not determinantly suicide in nature, despite the high chance of fatality for such act.
 The act of al-Baraa' were authorized by legal government which had de facto and de jure authority. in this case are the Rashidun Caliphate, which al-Baraa' owed his allegiance. While modern day terrorist organizations were non-state actors, which cannot burdened and binded with treaty, pact or responsibility.
 The targets of modern-day terrorists are not in line with al-Bara aggression in Yamama, since al-Bara' were targeting legitimate hostile combatants on the battlefield, while non-state terrorists also targeting illegitimate subjects recklessly, such as fellow Muslim civilians and Dhimmi non-Muslims who are forbidden to be harassed in Islamic beliefs. Furthermore, the act of suicide bombing terrorism during modern day in Palestine were deemed by Ibn Uthaymeen not beneficial to Islam and it will only do harm to the Muslim communities in Palestine, and to the perpetrator of the act as the bombers were threaten with hellfire in the afterlife.

The Fatwa by Abdu al-Aziz ibn Baz were particularly aimed to deny the ruling from Yusuf al-Qaradawi who viewed that the Martyrdom act of al-Bara' in battle and Ashabul Ukhdud in Yemen were viewed the same as suicide bombers in modern time.

Modern day grand Mufti of Saudi Sheikh Abdulaziz al-Sheikh, further strengthened his predecessors view by issuing Fatwa particularly disallow terroristm act of suicide bombing. Like the Salafi scholars before him, Abdulaziz al-Sheikh similarly saying suicide bombers does not represent the jurisprudential analogy with al-Bara' martyrdom, thus dismissing claim from proponents of modern-day practice of terrorism using suicide bombing as Jihad.

Institutions & landmarks 
In 20th AD modern era, there are several places and institutes which named over al-Bara ibn Malik, such as Al Bara' Bin Malik Mixed Elementary School in Saudi Arabia. While in Qatar, al-Bara' ibn Malik were also used as street name.

See also 
Sunni view of the Sahaba
List of Sahabah
Ridda wars
Early Caliphate navy

References

Footnotes

Secondary sources

Online biography 

640 deaths
Sahabah hadith narrators
Year of birth unknown
Sahabah martyrs
Khazrajite people
People of the Muslim conquest of Persia
Ansar (Islam)
Ridda Wars
Articles containing Arabic-language text